Buy (Bewä) is a river in Perm Krai, the Republic of Bashkortostan and the Republic of Udmurtia, Russia. It is a left tributary of the Kama.

It starts in the south of Perm Krai, in the Kuyedinsky District. Then, it flows through northwestern Bashkortostan and into the Kama River within the Udmurt Republic, to the south of the town of Kambarka.

Main tributaries:
Left: Arey, Amzya
Right: Oshya, Piz.

References  

Rivers of Perm Krai
Rivers of Bashkortostan
Rivers of Udmurtia